Moses Pethu (born 23 January 1984) is a South African cricketer. He played in two first-class and two List A matches for Border in 2006.

See also
 List of Border representative cricketers

References

External links
 

1984 births
Living people
South African cricketers
Border cricketers
Cricketers from East London, Eastern Cape